The Men's 1987 European Amateur Boxing Championships were held in Torino, Italy from 28 May to 7 June. The 27th edition of the bi-annual competition was organised by the European governing body for amateur boxing, EABA. There were 178 fighters from 25 countries participating.

Medal winners

Medal table

External links
Results
EABA Boxing
Amateur Boxing

European Amateur Boxing Championships
Boxing
European Amateur Boxing Championships
B
Sports competitions in Turin
European Amateur Boxing Championships
European Amateur Boxing Championships
1980s in Turin